This list is of Major Sites Protected for their Historical and Cultural Value at the National Level in the Municipality of Beijing.

 
 

 
 
 
 
 

 

 
 

 
 
 

 
|}

As well as sites protected at the national level there are 326 sites in Beijing that are under municipal protection (see zh or de).

See also
 Principles for the Conservation of Heritage Sites in China

References

External links
—Cultural Heritage Units under Municipal Protection in Beijing

 01
Beijing-related lists
Beijing